Robert Frank Tinney (born November 22, 1947) is an American contemporary illustrator known for his monthly cover illustrations for the microcomputer publication Byte magazine spanning over a decade. In so doing, Tinney became one of the first artists to create a broad yet consistent artistic concept for the computing world, combining a specific artistic style with visual metaphor to showcase emerging trends in personal computing technology.

Early life and work 
Robert Frank Tinney was born on November 22, 1947, in Penn Yan, New York. He later moved with his family to Baton Rouge, Louisiana. There he attended Istrouma High School where his talent for art, and specifically illustration, became distinctly apparent. He later attended Louisiana Polytechnic Institute, now known as Louisiana Tech University.

Byte magazine covers 
Carl Helmers, Editor-in-Chief for Byte, contacted Tinney about the new magazine in 1975; sending him a copy of the first issue released in September. Tinney was given the opportunity to produce the artwork for the magazine covers and his first print appeared on the December 1975 issue. Tinney created over 100 pieces of artwork for the magazine covers.

His artwork for Byte was done by hand and consisted of drawn illustrations with tissue paper, oil painting, and designer wash and airbrush.

Tinney would later sell limited edition prints of his Byte magazine covers to the general public; accepting orders on his website.

References

1947 births
Living people
American illustrators
Louisiana Tech University alumni